Mzingwane Dam is a reservoir on the Mzingwane River, near Esigodini, Zimbabwe, with a capacity of 42 million cubic metres. It supplies water to the city of Bulawayo.

References

Dams on the Mzingwane River
Buildings and structures in Matabeleland South Province